William Rickarby Miller (May 20, 1818 in Staindrop – July 1893 in New York City) was an American painter, of the Hudson River School.

Life
His father was Joseph Miller, a landscape painter.
He immigrated to New York City in 1844.

His work is in the Smithsonian American Art Museum, Metropolitan Museum of Art, and New York Historical Society.

Miller's original diary is currently held by the New-York Historical Society.

Gallery

References

External links

http://www.artnet.com/artists/william%20rickarby-miller/
http://bartowpellmansionmuseum.org/events/pastExhibits.php
http://www.barridoff.com/1752/
http://www.victorianhomesdecor.com/subjects/william_rickarby_miller_art.html
http://www.newpaltz.edu/museum/exhibitions/americanscenery/miller.htm
http://www.postroadgallery.com/millercatl.html
http://www.questroyalfineart.com/2167/boating-on-the-old-croton-reservoir-ny.html
Artwork by William Rickarby Miller

1818 births
1893 deaths
19th-century American painters
19th-century English painters
American male painters
English male painters
Still life painters
English emigrants to the United States
People from Staindrop
19th-century American male artists
19th-century English male artists